Rainz (Hangul: 레인즈) was a South Korean boy band consisting of seven members who previously participated in Mnet's 2017 survival show Produce 101 Season 2. They debuted on October 12, 2017, with Sunshine. They officially disbanded after concluding their last group activities in Japan on October 28, 2018, and returned to their respective agencies.

Members
 Kim Seong-ri (김성리)   
 Ju Won-tak (주원탁)
 Lee Ki-won (이기원)
 Jang Dae-hyeon (장대현)
 Hong Eun-ki (홍은기)
 Byun Hyun-min (변현민)
 Seo Sung-hyuk (서성혁)

Discography

Extended plays

Singles

Soundtrack appearances

References

External links
 

K-pop music groups
Musical groups established in 2017
South Korean boy bands
South Korean dance music groups
South Korean pop music groups
Musical groups from Seoul
Produce 101
Produce 101 contestants
2017 establishments in South Korea